The 2008–09 season was Arsenal Football Club's 17th consecutive season in the Premier League. This season Arsenal participated in the Premier League, FA Cup, League Cup and the UEFA Champions League. This was the first time since 1986 that Arsenal went four consecutive seasons without winning a trophy.

Events
 5 May: Midfielder Mathieu Flamini agrees to a four-year contract with Italian club Milan, meaning he will leave Arsenal on a free transfer on 1 July.
 23 May: Physiotherapist Neal Reynolds agrees to join Arsenal from Norwich City.
 28 May: Arsenal are granted a work permit for striker Carlos Vela, who spent the 2007–08 season on loan to Osasuna.
 3 June: Goalkeeper Jens Lehmann joins VfB Stuttgart on a free transfer.
 4 June: Defender Bacary Sagna signs a new "long-term" contract with Arsenal.
 9 June: Central defender/defensive midfielder Alex Song agrees to a new "long-term" contract with Arsenal.
 9 June: Physiotherapist Gary Lewin agrees to leave Arsenal to become full-time Head of Physiotherapy for England on 1 August.
 13 June: Midfielder Aaron Ramsey signs for Arsenal from Cardiff City.
 20 June: Defender Gaël Clichy signs a new "long-term" contract with Arsenal.
 11 July: Attacking midfielder Samir Nasri signs for Arsenal from Marseille.
 16 July: Attacking midfielder Alexander Hleb signs for Barcelona from Arsenal.
 17 July: Defensive midfielder Gilberto Silva signs for Panathinaikos from Arsenal.
 30 July: Arsenal sign midfielder Amaury Bischoff from Werder Bremen.
 9 August: Arsenal retains their Amsterdam Tournament Title after drawing 1–1 with Sevilla.
 13 August: Arsenal start their European campaign by defeating Twente in the first leg of their 2008–09 UEFA Champions League Third Round Qualifying Round.
 16 August: Defender Justin Hoyte signs for Middlesbrough from Arsenal.
 18 August: Striker Emmanuel Adebayor signs a new "long-term" contract with Arsenal.
 20 August: Arsenal sign Defender Mikaël Silvestre from Manchester United. Silvestre becomes the first Manchester United player to join Arsenal since Brian Kidd in 1974 .
 23 August: Arsenal suffer their first defeat of the season against Fulham by losing 1–0 from a Brede Hangeland goal.
 27 August: Arsenal qualify for the group stages of the Champions League by defeating Twente 4–0 at the Emirates Stadium and 6–0 on aggregate.
 1 September: Defender Kieran Gibbs signs a new contract with Arsenal.
 22 September: Swiss defender Johan Djourou signs a new "long-term" contract with Arsenal.
 27 September: Arsenal's second defeat at the Emirates Stadium was a 2–1 loss to Hull City who came back from an Arsenal lead early in the second half.
 21 November: Sky Sports News and the BBC report that William Gallas has been stripped of the Arsenal captaincy following a verbal outburst against other players, however Arsenal FC refuse to comment.
 24 November: Arsène Wenger announces that Cesc Fàbregas is the new permanent Arsenal captain, thus confirming reports that William Gallas has been stripped of the captaincy.
 23 December: Arsenal captain Cesc Fàbregas is ruled out for 4 months with a ligament injury after colliding with fellow Spaniard Xabi Alonso in a 1–1 draw with Liverpool.
 5 January: Midfielder Jack Wilshere signs a professional contract with Arsenal.
 3 February: After protracted transfer negotiations, Arsenal announce the signing of Russian international Andrey Arshavin for an undisclosed fee.
 8 February: 350 days after suffering a broken leg and open dislocation to his ankle, striker Eduardo is named on the substitutes bench in Arsenal's 0–0 draw against rivals Tottenham Hotspur.
 16 February: Striker Eduardo makes his first start in nearly a year in Arsenal's fourth round replay against Cardiff. He scores twice before being substituted in the 67th minute in a 4–0 win.
 11 March: Arsenal progress to the quarter-finals of the Champions League after beating Roma 7–6 on penalties after the tie was level at 1–1 after two legs.
 14 March: Andrey Arshavin scores his first goal for Arsenal in the club's 4–0 Premier League victory over Blackburn Rovers.
 18 April: Amid various injuries in defence, Arsenal are knocked out of the FA Cup in a 2–1 defeat to Chelsea at Wembley Stadium in the semi-finals.
 21 April: 4 goals from man of the match Andrey Arshavin dents Liverpool's Premier League title hopes. The match at Anfield ends in a 4–4 draw.
 5 May: Arsenal are knocked out of the UEFA Champions League, losing 4–1 on aggregate to defending champions, Manchester United.
 8 May: Striker Theo Walcott signs a new "long-term" contract with Arsenal.
 8 May: Striker Nicklas Bendtner is fined for "unacceptable" behaviour following nightclub disrepute after the Manchester United game. Bendtner apologised for his actions shortly afterward.

Players

Squad information

Transfers

In 

Total spending:  £32,550,000

Out 

Total income:  £15,900,000

Loan out

Overall transfer activity

Spending
  £32,550,000

Income
  £15,900,000

Net expenditure
  £16,650,000

Squad stats

|}
Source: Arsenal F.C.

Disciplinary record

Start formations

Club

Coaching staff

Kit
Supplier: Nike / Sponsor: Fly Emirates

Kit information
The completely new set of Arsenal kit was launched.
Home The home kit was rather controversial, as Nike ditched the white sleeves that the club was well known for. The shirt has a white wide stripe on each sleeve, flanked by two dark red, narrower stripes. It has a red V-neck collar which is the same colour as the primary shirt colour. The shirt is complemented by white shorts with a dark-red trim, and white socks with a red horizontal stripe. Red socks with white horizontal stripe were used in some away games. Arsenal revealed that the kit would be used for two seasons.
Away The away kit harps back to the glory days of the late 1980s which gave the strip a modern touch, where the shirts are yellow with navy sleeves and a red trim. The shorts are navy with red trim and the socks are yellow and blue. It featured red trimmings on the side of the strip.
Third: The third kit retained away kit last season was unchanged.
Keeper The three goalkeeper kit, which were all based on Nike's new template, which in turn featured one conspicuous swirl on the kit. The main kit was grey, but the second kit was green/navy and the third kit black was available, should they be required.

Other information

Competitions

Overall

Premier League

Final league table

Results summary

Results by round

Matches

UEFA Champions League

Third qualifying round

Group stage

Knockout phase

Round of 16

Quarter-finals

Semi-finals

FA Cup

Football League Cup

Pre-season

Last updated: 9 AugustSource: Arsenal FC

See also

 2008–09 in English football
 List of Arsenal F.C. seasons

References

External links
 Arsenal 2008-09 on statto.com

Arsenal F.C. seasons
Arsenal